Jacob Boss Jr. is an American baseball coach and former player, who is the current head baseball coach of the Michigan State Spartans. He played college baseball at Alma College for head coach Bill Klenk from 1990 to 1993. He then served as the head coach of the Eastern Michigan Eagles in 2008.

Early career 
Boss played college baseball at Division III Alma College from 1990–1993.  In the mid-1990s, Boss served as a high school and community college baseball coach before accepting an assistant coaching position at Eastern Michigan prior to the 1997 season.  He left Eastern Michigan after the 2004 season to serve as an assistant at Michigan from 2005–2007.

Head coaching career 
Boss was named the head coach at Eastern Michigan for the 2008 season and spent one year there.  Under Boss, the team lost its first 17 games but went 25–17 for the remainder of the season.  The Eagles won the Mid-American Conference (MAC) Western Division Title and the MAC Tournament, thus qualifying for the NCAA Tournament.

On July 1, 2008, Boss was named head baseball coach at Michigan State.  Boss made his first NCAA Tournament appearance with Michigan State in 2012.

Record 
Below is a table of Boss's yearly records as an NCAA head baseball coach.

Personal life
Boss has a nephew, Ike Irish, who plays baseball.

See also
List of current NCAA Division I baseball coaches

References

Alma Scots baseball players
Year of birth missing (living people)
Place of birth missing (living people)
Living people
High school baseball coaches in the United States
Iowa Central Tritons baseball coaches
Eastern Michigan University alumni 
Eastern Michigan Eagles baseball coaches
Michigan State Spartans baseball coaches
Michigan Wolverines baseball coaches